Charleston Springs is an unincorporated community located within Millstone Township in Monmouth County, in the U.S. state of New Jersey. Stage Coach Road, also designated County Route 524, is the main road that runs through the settlement, with Ely Harmony Road as the intersecting road defining the locality. The Manalapan Brook runs to the west of the center of Charleston Springs and CR 537 runs to the south of the area.

References

Millstone Township, New Jersey
Unincorporated communities in Monmouth County, New Jersey
Unincorporated communities in New Jersey